Siləyli (also, Seleyli and Sileyli) is a village and municipality in the Qabala Rayon of Azerbaijan.  It has a population of 256.

References 

Populated places in Qabala District